Rezki Hamroune (born March 10, 1996 in Kouba) is an Algerian footballer who plays for Pharco FC in the Egyptian Premier League. He is the cousin of footballer Jugurtha Hamroun.

In 2014, Hamroune signed a two-year professional contract with Dijon FCO, joining them on a free transfer from JSM Béjaïa.

On 11 June 2018, he signed a two-year contract with JS Kabylie from Dijon FCO.

References

External links
 

1996 births
Living people
People from Kouba
Algerian footballers
Algeria international footballers
Algeria youth international footballers
Algerian expatriate footballers
Algerian expatriate sportspeople in France
Algerian Ligue Professionnelle 1 players
Dijon FCO players
Wasquehal Football players
Expatriate footballers in France
JS Kabylie players
SC Selongey players
NA Hussein Dey players
NARB Réghaïa players
Association football forwards
21st-century Algerian people